The 1980 Pacific hurricane season officially started May 15, 1980, in the eastern Pacific and June 1, 1980, in the central Pacific, lasting until November 30, 1980. These dates conventionally delimit each year when most tropical cyclones form in the northeastern and central Pacific Ocean. This season was relatively uneventful; since no tropical cyclones made landfall, there were no reports of casualties or damage.

Overall, the 1980 season was slightly below the long-term average, with 16 tropical cyclones forming. Of those, 15 were named, 7 reached hurricane intensity, and only 3 became major hurricanes by attaining category 3 status or higher on the Saffir–Simpson scale. All eastern Pacific systems this year formed in the eastern Pacific proper and two storms crossed into the central Pacific: Carmen from the west and Kay from the east. The season had an early start when Carmen crossed over the International Date Line in April. Kay lasted for fourteen and a half days, which was the fifth-longest-lasting Pacific hurricane at the time.


Season summary 

The 1980 Pacific hurricane season began on April 5, 1980, with the crossing of the International Date Line by Tropical Storm Carmen and ended with the dissipation of Tropical Depression Newton on October 29. Of the sixteen tropical cyclones that in the eastern north Pacific Ocean during 1980, one was a tropical depression, eight were tropical storms, and seven were hurricanes, of which three were major hurricanes of Category or higher on the Saffir–Simpson scale. Of these systems, all except one tropical storm formed east of 140°W in the eastern Pacific proper. These totals are below the long-term average of fifteen tropical storms, nine hurricanes, and four major hurricanes. Two tropical cyclones existed in the central Pacific, both of which crossed in from other tropical cyclone basins. This total is below the average of four or five tropical cyclones per year.

Systems

Tropical Storm Carmen 

On April 4, a tropical depression formed just east of the International Date Line. At the time, the Joint Typhoon Warning Center (JTWC) designated it tropical depression 02W. As it moved generally northwestwards, it strengthened into a tropical storm just before crossing the dateline, but only received a name in the northwest Pacific, being designated Carmen. After peaking with maximum sustained winds of 70 mph (110 km/h) on April 6. Carmen recurved northeast and crossed the International Date Line, entering the central Pacific on April 7. The JTWC subsequently relinquished responsibility to the Central Pacific Hurricane Center. Carmen lost its initial motion and stalled in the area, ultimately weakening into a tropical depression on April 8. The depression dissipated the following day and the remnant low returned to the western Pacific.

Tropical Storm Carmen caused no deaths or damages in the Central Pacific Hurricane Center's area of responsibility. It is the only known tropical cyclone in the central Pacific to exist in April. In addition, it was the first northern hemisphere tropical cyclone to cross the dateline from west to east since Tropical Storm Virginia in 1968.

Hurricane Agatha 

After becoming better organized, EPHC upgraded the depression into a tropical storm later that day, giving it the name Agatha. The storm turned north then northwest and strengthened into a hurricane. On June 12, Agatha reached its peak intensity with maximum sustained winds of 115 mph (185 km/h), a category 3 hurricane on the Saffir–Simpson hurricane wind scale. After entering an area with cooler sea surface temperature and stable air, Agatha steadily weakened into a tropical storm on June 13 and a tropical depression on June 14. The EPHC issued the last advisory on Agatha on the following day as Agatha rapidly dissipated.

Tropical Storm Blas 

A disturbance south-southwest of Acapulco developed a circulation and was designated Tropical Storm Blas, skipping the depression stage. Blas headed northwest, and intensified, peaking in windspeed on June 16. The cyclone then steadily weakened and dissipated on June 19, twelve hours after weakening into a tropical depression.

Tropical Depression Three 

A disturbance south of Acapulco developed into a tropical depression on June 17. It moved northwest and then west, and never strengthened much. The tropical cyclone dissipated on June 19 after moving over cooler waters.

Hurricane Celia 

A tropical disturbance moving west-northwestward organized into a tropical depression on June 25. It quickly strengthened to Tropical Storm Celia. Celia intensified into a hurricane on June 26 and reached its peak intensity from June 26 to June 28. Celia then curved to the northwest as it wheeled around the edge of a ridge. Celia weakened into a tropical storm on June 28, a depression on June 29, and dissipated just after that. It remnants remained, and cloudiness and moisture associated with the cyclone were carried into the Continental United States by an upper-level trough.

Celia"s remnants and moisture brought rain to Santa Barbara County, California, on the last two days of June. Other than that, Celia caused no impact.

Tropical Storm Darby 

On July 1, a westward-moving tropical disturbance located to the southwest of Acapulco organized into a tropical depression. The next day, it intensified into a tropical storm as it briefly jogged to the north. Darby peaked in wind speed just after that. It then weakened into a depression on July 3 and dissipated later that day.

Tropical Storm Estelle 

An area of disturbed weather developed gale-force winds and a cyclonic circulation and was upgraded directly to tropical storm status on July 12. Estelle's winds peaked in velocity just after that. The cyclone then steadily weakened as it curved to the west-northwest. Estelle dissipated on July 13. Estelle did not affect land. No damage or casualties were attributed to this tropical cyclone.

Tropical Storm Frank 

A tropical disturbance northeast of Clipperton organized into a tropical depression on July 18. Heading northwestwards, it intensified into a tropical storm on July 20. Frank reached its maximum wind speed shortly after that. The cyclone then turned to the west and gradually weakened, dissipating on July 22.

Hurricane Georgette 

A tropical disturbance formed southwest of Acapulco on July 26. The disturbance was then upgraded to a tropical depression on July 28. The cyclone headed northwest. It intensified into a tropical storm on July 29. That same day, Georgette was briefly a hurricane. The cyclone turned to the west and weakened, dissipating on July 31.

Hurricane Howard 

A tropical disturbance south of Acapulco developed into a tropical depression on July 31. It headed west, and then gradually curved to the northwest as it paralleled the coast of Mexico. The cyclone became a storm shortly after forming, a hurricane on August 2, and peaked in windspeed on August 4. It then steadily weakened after that, and dissipated over cool waters shortly after becoming a tropical depression on August 7. Howard threatened the coasts of Southern California and the northern part of the Baja California Peninsula, but in the end, never approached land.

Hurricane Isis 

A tropical disturbance south of Acapulco developed into a tropical depression on August 5 and a tropical storm the next day. Isis headed generally west-northwest and peaked as a Category 2 hurricane on August 8. Isis then weakened, becoming a tropical storm on August 10, turning to the west, and dissipating the next day.

Hurricane Javier 

An area of disturbed weather south of the Gulf of Tehuantepec became a tropical depression on August 22 and a storm the next day. Javier became a hurricane on August 24 and peaked as a major hurricane on August 25. Javier then weakened, becoming a tropical storm on August 27 and a storm the next day. It dissipated on August 29, having moved west-northwest for almost its entire life.

Hurricane Kay 

A tropical disturbance south of Acapulco developed into a tropical depression on September 16 and a tropical storm later that day. Kay headed in an irregular but generally west-northwest path out to sea. Kay strengthened into a hurricane on September 17. It continued strengthening and reached its peak as a Category 4 hurricane on the Saffir–Simpson scale on September 18. Kay then slowly weakened and was a tropical storm by September 20. Kay's forward motion slowed as it neared the central Pacific. It restrengthened into a hurricane on September 23, crossed 140°W, and entered the Central Pacific Hurricane Center's area of responsibility the next day. Kay executed a small anticyclonic loop, and then began weakening again. It became a tropical storm again on September 27, and a depression two days later. The cyclone dissipated on September 30 while located north of the Hawaiian Islands. Kay did not effect land, causing no damage or casualties. Kay lasted for 14.5 days, enough to make it the fifth-longest-lasting Pacific hurricane at the time.

Tropical Storm Lester 

A westward-moving disturbance south of Acapulco strengthened into a tropical depression on September 21. Continuing on its path, it intensified into Tropical Storm Lester on September 23. Lester's motion then slowed down, and it spun about in the open ocean until it dissipated on September 25.

Tropical Storm Madeline 

A disturbance east of Clipperton became a tropical depression and then a tropical storm. It headed northwest and weakened into a depression on October 12. It dissipated shortly afterward.

Tropical Storm Newton 

An area of disturbed weather southeast of Socorro Island became a tropical storm on October 28. It headed northeast and approached the coast of Mexico. However, an area of high wind shear and cool waters destroyed the cyclone on October 29, before it could reach the coast. Newton was the tropical cyclone that came closest to making landfall this season. However, no impact was reported.

Storm names 
The following names were used for named storms that formed in the eastern Pacific in 1980. No names were retired, so it was used again in the 1986 season. This was the first time most of these names were used since the modern lists began, except for Agatha, Estelle, Georgette, and Madeline, which were previously used in the old four-year lists.

In contrast to previous years, where tropical cyclones forming in the central Pacific received names from the western Pacific naming lists, a separate set of five central Pacific hurricane naming lists were created for the 1980 season. The list used for the 1980 season was intended to be reused for the 1985 season. However, as no storms formed in the central Pacific in 1980, these five naming lists were scrapped and replaced with the modern set of central Pacific naming lists for the following season. The first name to be used on the modern lists was Akoni in the 1982 season.

See also 

 List of Pacific hurricanes
 Pacific hurricane season
 1980 Atlantic hurricane season
 1980 Pacific typhoon season
 1980 North Indian Ocean cyclone season
 Australian cyclone seasons: 1979–80, 1980–81
 South Pacific cyclone seasons: 1979–80, 1980–81
 South-West Indian Ocean cyclone seasons: 1979–80, 1980–81

References

External links 
 Eastern North Pacific Tropical Cyclones of 1980
 CPHC Season Summary
 Unisys Weather archive for the Eastern Pacific, 1980
 ATCR archive for Tropical Storm Carmen

 
Pacific hurricane seasons
Articles which contain graphical timelines
1980 EPAC